Smolna may refer to the following places:

 Smolna, Helsinki, Finland
 Smolna, Lower Silesian Voivodeship, Poland
 Smolna Street, Warsaw, Poland